Paperboy.com is India's first newspaper aggregating mobile and web platform launched by 18-year-old Jonna Venkata Karthik Raja  in February 2016. The company is headquartered in Bangalore, India. The app features around 450 newspapers and magazines in more than 18 languages, which are uploaded on a real-time basis. It has applications available for iOS and Android, and is accessible from Paperboy's website.

Paperboy has been awarded the "Best Tech Aggregator" award by Franchise India and Entrepreneur magazine at the Startup Awards 2018 held in IIT Delhi.

References

External links 
http://www.estrade.in/our-primary-focus-is-on-tier-2-tier-3-city-readers-paperboy-com/
http://www.asiabiztoday.com/2017/07/07/the-news-paper-aggregator-with-a-zeal-for-innovation/
http://www.business-standard.com/article/news-ani/18-year-old-launches-india-s-first-print-newspaper-and-magazine-aggregator-paperboy-117073100750_1.html
http://ummid.com/news/2017/August/02.08.2017/indias-first-print-newspaper-magazine-aggregator-paperboy.html

Companies based in Bangalore
Mobile applications
2016 establishments in Karnataka
Indian companies established in 2016